was a Japanese football player. He played for Japan national team.

Club career
Goto was born in Kobe, Japan, to a Belgian father. He played for Kwangaku Club was consisted of his alma mater Kwansei Gakuin University players and graduates. He won 1929 and 1930 Emperor's Cup at the club.

National team career
In May 1930, when Goto was a Kwansei Gakuin University student, he was selected Japan national team for 1930 Far Eastern Championship Games in Tokyo and Japan won the championship. At this competition, on May 25, he debuted against Philippines. In 1934, he was also selected Japan for 1934 Far Eastern Championship Games in Manila. At this competition, he played 2 games as Japan team captain. He played 4 games for Japan until 1934.

Goto died in 1976.

National team statistics

References

External links
 
 Japan National Football Team Database

Year of birth missing
1976 deaths
Kwansei Gakuin University alumni
Association football people from Hyōgo Prefecture
Japanese footballers
Japan international footballers
Association football defenders
Japanese people of Belgian descent